Aereon was an aircraft manufacturer specializing in hybrid airships. It was founded in Princeton, New Jersey in 1959.

Aircraft
AEREON III
AEREON 26
AEREON Dynairship
Aereon WASP

External links
 Company website
 The Atlantic update

Defunct aircraft manufacturers of the United States
Companies based in Princeton, New Jersey
Airships of the United States
Manufacturing companies established in 1959
1959 establishments in New Jersey